Half & Half is an American television sitcom created by Jeffrey Klarik that aired on UPN from September 23, 2002, to May 15, 2006. The show focuses on the lives of two paternal half-sisters in their twenties who were estranged throughout their childhood, and are finally developing a close relationship. The series is set in San Francisco.

Half & Half was the second-most-watched show on UPN's Monday night line-up (next to Girlfriends) and fourth overall on the network. The series was almost renewed for a fifth season by The CW, but due to several circumstances—including the network’s contractual obligation to pick up Reba, the last-minute renewal of All of Us, and the pick-up of the Girlfriends spin-off The Game—the series was left off the network’s fall 2006 schedule and cancelled.  The series has aired in reruns on Global TV in Canada, Trouble in the United Kingdom and in local syndication, Bounce TV, and BET Her in the United States.

The series is available to stream on Netflix, Paramount+, and Amazon Prime Video.

Premise
The show's plot centers around the lives of half-sisters Mona and DeeDee Thorne, who slowly become friends when they move into the same San Francisco apartment building. Mona is the daughter of Phyllis Thorne, Charles Thorne's first wife, and DeeDee is Charles' daughter from his second marriage to Deirdre "Big DeeDee" Thorne. Initially, Mona resents DeeDee because DeeDee grew up in a rich and privileged household, while Mona and her mother struggled financially. As adults, Mona is more street smart and cynical, but prone to impulsive decisions while DeeDee is charming and optimistic, but naïve at times. Throughout the series, the sisters confront their past resentments and learn to lean on each other as they navigate their problems in work, love, and family.

Cast

Main
Rachel True as Mona Rose Thorne. The elder of the two sisters and daughter of Phyllis Thorne and Charles Thorne. Mona was primarily raised by Phyllis and grew up resenting DeeDee for having their father's attention and growing up in a privileged household. As the series progresses, the two become closer and Mona enjoys her role as DeeDee's big sister. She is cynical, insecure, and prone to impulsive decisions.
Essence Atkins as Deirdre Chantal "Dee Dee" Thorne, Esq. The younger of the two sisters and daughter of Big DeeDee LaFontaine Thorne and Charles Thorne.  She grew up to be a bossy, materialistic, fashion-savvy woman like her mother, but slowly matures to become a more well-rounded individual under Mona's influence. Throughout the series, she studies at law school and eventually becomes a sports agent.
Telma Hopkins as Phyllis Thorne. The mother of Mona Thorne and the ex-wife of Charles Thorne. She is loving but over-bearing. Being a psychiatrist, she is prone to meddling in Mona's life and often gives advice to Mona and her friends. She has a contentious relationship with Big DeeDee and initially thinks the worst of DeeDee as well. As the series progresses, she serves as mother figure for DeeDee and occasionally gets along with Big DeeDee.
Valarie Pettiford as Deirdre "Big Dee Dee" LaFontaine Thorne. The mother of DeeDee Thorne and the current wife of Charles Thorne. She is a superficial fashionista, who can be controlling and prone to dramatics. However, she cares deeply about DeeDee and eventually grows to care for Mona as well, often offering advice to the both of them. She has an on-going rivalry with Phyllis, although the two occasionally call a truce. 
Chico Benymon as Andre Spencer Williams. Mona's best friend and co-worker, whom she's known since college. The two briefly date throughout the series, but remain on good terms. 
Alec Mapa as Adam Benet. Mona's openly gay assistant who is very nosy and gossipy. He often hits on Spencer and insults Mona on her unfashionable appearance.

Recurring
MC Lyte as Kai Owens, Mona's boss
Obba Babatundé as Charles Thorne, Mona and Dee Dee's father; ex-husband of Phyllis and current husband of Big Dee Dee
Estelle Harris as Sophie, Mona's grandmother (and Phyllis' mother), who is white and Jewish
 Corey Holcomb as Chauncey, Spencer's cousin. 
Joey Lawrence as Brett Mahoney
Coby Bell as Glen Stallworth
Keith Robinson as Neil Crawford
Michelle Williams as Naomi Dawson
Penny Bae Bridges as Young Mona
Gabby Soleil as Young Dee Dee
Yvette Nicole Brown as Ceci
Louis Gossett Jr. as Ray Willis, Spencer's father
Suzy Nakamura as Tina
Lamman Rucker as Chase
Charles Divins as Lorenzo
Rowena King as Camille

Episodes

Series overview

Season 1: 2002–03

Season 2: 2003–04

Season 3: 2004–05

Season 4: 2005–06

Accolades

References

External links 
 
 

2000s American romantic comedy television series
2002 American television series debuts
2006 American television series endings
2000s American black sitcoms
UPN original programming
Television series about sisters
Television shows set in San Francisco
Television series by CBS Studios